North Sydney Demonstration School (NSDS) is a primary school located in Waverton, New South Wales, Australia. It is one of only three demonstration schools in New South Wales.

Overview 
Structured education levels provided at "North Sydney Dem" range from kindergarten to sixth grade. North Sydney Demonstration School is a school co-operating with the University of Sydney, in partnership the school and university foster and support the use of evidence based and innovative teaching practices to ensure a quality 21st century education for all. The school also actively participates in data collection for educational research projects and in the development of educational materials.
North Sydney Demonstration School is situated on the land which was owned by Lady Hay and Alexander Berry. Before the school was called North Sydney Public School, it was known as Greenwood's School.

References 

Public primary schools in Sydney